Morarano Gare is a town and commune in Madagascar. It belongs to the district of Moramanga, which is a part of Alaotra-Mangoro Region. The population of the commune was 17,545 in 2018.

7 fokontany (villages) belong to the commune that are:
Marovoay, Morarano Gare, AmbohidrayMarofody, Androfia and Sakalava.

Primary and junior level secondary education are available in town. The majority 98% of the population of the commune are farmers.  The most important crop is rice, while other important products are cassava and sweet potatoes.  Industry and services provide both employment for 1% of the population.

Transport
The town is situated at 30 km from Moramanga on the RN44 and the railway line Moramanga – Ambatondrazaka (MLA: Moramanga-Lac-Alaotra).

References

Populated places in Alaotra-Mangoro